Sevirova is a commune in Florești District, Moldova. It is composed of two villages, Ivanovca and Sevirova.

Notable people
 Dimitrie Cărăuș

References

Communes of Florești District